Colette Doherty is an Irish poker player.

In her career, she won the Irish Poker Open twice, including in its inaugural year, 1980, and again in 1991.

She is also noted as the first European and first female player to play in the World Series of Poker, a position she earned through her first Irish Poker Open win, in a deal with Terry Rogers.

She also made two appearances in Late Night Poker and has played at the Gutshot Card Club.

External links
Hendon Mob tournament results

Female poker players
Irish poker players
Irish Poker Open winners
Living people
Year of birth missing (living people)